Monsignor Dilwyn Lewis (28 April 1924 – 10 July 2000) was a British clothes designer turned Roman Catholic priest who oversaw the restoration of the ancient Basilica di Santa Maria Maggiore in Rome.

Biography
Raised in an orphanage, Bridgend Cottage Homes, in his birth town of Bridgend in Wales, Dilwyn John David Lewis studied for the ministry in the Church of England at Kelham College but instead became a clothing salesman before embarking on a successful career as a freelance clothing designer in London. Cardinal Montini, the future Pope Paul VI, suggested Lewis join the priesthood in 1960, but it was 1974 before Lewis was ordained at Arundel Cathedral. When Lewis received Pope John Paul II on his arrival at Gatwick Airport, where Lewis was chaplain, in 1982, he caught the attention of Archbishop Bruno Heim and Cardinal Basil Hume, who saw to it that in 1984 he was posted as a canon of the Basilica di Santa Maria Maggiore in Rome.

Working under Cardinal Luigi Dadaglio, archpriest of the Basilica, Lewis was appointed Vicar Capitular by John Paul II and put in charge of the administration and restoration of the Basilica, which was in an alarmingly poor state of repair and threatened with financial ruin after years of mismanagement. Lewis raised funds for the repair bill, estimated at more than £9,000,000.

In addition to assisting with restoration, Lewis organised musical performances and special events at the Basilica and coordinated collaborations with the Church of England, including arranging for the loan of St. Thomas Becket's yellow silk dalmatic to the Canterbury Cathedral and for the celebration in the Basilica of the Eucharist by Anglican priests.

Dilwyn Lewis was buried in the crypt of Basilica di Santa Maria Maggiore following his death in Ireland in 2000.

Commemoration 
In July 2022 a blue plaque was unveiled in his honour at St. Marys Bridgend, where he had donated many hundreds of pounds and the Allen organ, and remembered via an engraving of his coat of arms on one of the windows in the Narthex. The citing of the Blue Plaque on St Mary's will mean many more people will be able to view his window and see our church as part of Monsignor Dilwyn's legacy to Bridgend and the church he served.

References

External links
 www.encyclopedia.com
 Obituary in The Telegraph for Monsignor Lewis
 Kelham Fathers

1924 births
2000 deaths
20th-century British Roman Catholic priests
Converts to Roman Catholicism
Deaths from diabetes
Welsh expatriates in Italy
People from Bridgend
Welsh Roman Catholic priests
20th-century Welsh people
British expatriates in Italy